is a single-member constituency of the House of Representatives in the Diet of Japan. It is located in central Iwate and consists of the prefectural capital Morioka city and the two remaining towns in Shiwa district. Before 2017, it covered of the majority of the prefectural capital Morioka (the whole city without the former village of Tamayama) and Shiwa county.  As of 2012, 278,860 eligible voters were registered in the district.

Before the electoral reform of 1994, the area had been part of the multi-member Iwate 1st district that elected four Representatives by single non-transferable vote.

Iwate is the home of Ichirō Ozawa and like three of the prefecture's four post-reform districts, the 1st district had been represented by his parties from its creation to 2012: the New Frontier Party, the Liberal Party and the Democratic Party. In 2012, Ozawa and his followers split from the Democratic Party: 1st district representative Shina stayed with the Democrats, Ozawa's Tomorrow Party of Japan nominated Yōko Tasso, the wife of former representative and current Iwate governor Takuya Tasso; but Shina defended the district against Tasso and Liberal Democratic former prefectural assembly member Hinako Takahashi who won a proportional block seat.

List of representatives

Election results 
 DC: Dual candidate (jūfuku rikkōho) standing simultaneously for a seat in the Tōhoku proportional representation block
 $: Lost deposit and if a dual candidate: is also ineligible as a proportional candidate

References 

Iwate Prefecture
Districts of the House of Representatives (Japan)
1994 establishments in Japan